Sherry Golf Jerez is a golf course located in Jerez de la Frontera in Andalusia, Spain.

Design 

The course was designed by Stirling&Martin (Global Golf Company)

Events 

Since 2006 hosts the 2nd classification phase for the European PGA

References

External links 

Golf clubs and courses in Spain
Sport in Jerez de la Frontera
Sports venues in Andalusia